Arenibacterium halophilum is a Gram-negative, halotolerant, strictly aerobic, non-spore-forming and motile bacterium from the genus of Arenibacterium.

References 

Rhodobacteraceae
Bacteria described in 2020